Urs Huber (born 12 August 1985) is a Swiss Mountain biker. Huber is a specialist in the marathon rides.

Career Highlights

2005
 1st Overall iXS Swiss Bike Classic
2006
 1st Overall iXS Swiss Bike Classic
2007
 1st Overall iXS Swiss Bike Classic
 1st Overall iXS Euro Bike Extremes
2008
 1st Overall iXS Swiss Bike Classic
 1st Dolomiti Superbike
 1st Iron Bike Race
 3rd UCI Mountain Bike Marathon World Championships
2009
 1st Overall Crocodile Trophy
 1st Stage 1
 1st Stage 8
 1st Overall Rocky Mountain Marathon Series
 1st Overall iXS Swiss Bike Classic
2010
 1st Overall Crocodile Trophy
 1st Stage 1
 1st Stage 10
 1st Overall Rocky Mountain Marathon Series
 1st Dolomiti Superbike
2011
 1st  National Marathon Champion
 1st overall Craft Bike TransAlp (with Konny Looser)
 1st Stage 1
 1st Stage 4
 1st Stage 5
 1st Stage 6
1st Dolomiti Superbike
1st Stage 2 Crocodile Trophy
1st Stage 3 Crocodile Trophy

References

1985 births
Living people
Swiss male cyclists
Marathon mountain bikers
People from Muri District
Cape Epic winners
Swiss mountain bikers
Sportspeople from Aargau